The Kindler Literature encyclopedia (in German: Das Kindler Literatur Lexikon) is an encyclopedia released in Germany covering information about world literature. Its first edition was released from 1965 to 1972 (7 volumes). Its second and third edition were distributed from 1988 to 1992 (20 volumes) and in 2009 (18 volumes). In 1999 a CD-ROM version was released.

For the first release the publisher Helmut Kindler started to translate articles from the Italian encyclopedia "Dizionario Letterario Bompiani". Additionally Kindler hired a crew to wrote articles on their own. As the first edition started as a translation, its primary focus was romanesque literature. With the second edition the former translations were to be rewritten. After a lot of nation building in between the 2. and 3. edition, some countries literature were merged (e.g. Russia and Ukraine).

In 2009 the German newspaper Die Welt called the Kindler superior to Wikipedia articles. From all the articles in the 2009 edition, the half was newly rewritten. An Online version went live at the same time.

See also
 German literature
 List of German-language authors

References 

German encyclopedias